Matiya Mulumba, also known as Matthias Murumba Kalemba (1836 - May 30, 1886), was a Ugandan Roman Catholic, one of the Martyrs of Uganda, who was martyred on or around May 30, 1886 at around the age of 50.

External links
Saint Matiya Mulumba at Patron Saints Index
The Uganda Martyrs from the August 2008 issue of The Word Among Us magazine
Matiya Mulumba's profile from UgandaMartyrsShrine.org

Matiya Mulumba's profile from Dictionary of African Christian Biography

1836 births
1886 deaths
19th-century Christian saints
19th-century executions by Uganda
19th-century Roman Catholic martyrs
Converts to Roman Catholicism from pagan religions
Executed Ugandan people
People executed by Buganda
People executed by dismemberment
Ugandan Roman Catholic saints